Callum Chick (born 25 November 1996) is an English professional rugby union player who plays as a Number 8 for Newcastle Falcons in Premiership Rugby.

Career

Club
Chick joined Newcastle Falcons academy at just 12 years old, also playing youth rugby for amateur side Ponteland RFC. Chick signed his first professional contract with Newcastle Falcons at the conclusion of the 2014-2015 season. From there he went on to captain the Falcon's Rugby Sevens side. Chick made his Aviva Premiership debut on 28 October 2016, against Wasps, going on to make 15 starts in all competitions in the 2016-2017 season. On 24 February 2018, Chick scored his first Premiership try after coming off the bench, in an away win at Harlequins.

International
Chick played for England's under-16 and under-18 sides. He captained the England under-20 team during the 2016 Six Nations Under 20s Championship. He was a member of the side that won the 2016 World Rugby Under 20 Championship and scored a try in the final against Ireland.

In June 2021 he was selected by Eddie Jones for the senior England squad and on 4 July 2021 made his debut against the United States at Twickenham.

References

External links
Newcastle Falcons Profile

1996 births
Living people
English rugby union players
England international rugby union players
Newcastle Falcons players
Rugby union number eights
Rugby union players from Newcastle upon Tyne
People educated at Gosforth Academy